The Deep South Rugby Football Union (DSRFU) is a Local Area Union (LAU) for rugby union teams in the Southeastern United States. The DSRFU is part of the True South Geographical Union, one of the Geographical Unions (GUs) that comprise USA Rugby. It is a non-profit organization and is the primary overseeing body for the promotion of rugby union in the region.

The DSRFU is divided into four divisions: Men, Women, College Men, and College Women. The union includes clubs from Alabama, the Florida Panhandle, Louisiana and Mississippi.

Men's clubs
 Baton Rouge Rugby Football Club
 Battleship Rugby Football Club
 Birmingham Rugby Football Club
 Jackson Rugby Football Club
 Montgomery Rugby Football Club
 New Orleans Rugby Football Club
 Okaloosa Rugby Football Club
 Panama City Beach Rugby Football Club
 Pensacola Rugby Football Club
 Tallahassee Rugby Football Club

Women's clubs
New Orleans Halfmoons Women's Rugby Club

Collegiate Men's clubs
 Louisiana State University rugby
 Loyola University New Orleans rugby
 Mississippi State University rugby
 University of Southern Mississippi rugby
 Spring Hill College rugby
Tulane University Rugby

See also
Rugby union in the United States

References

External links
USA Rugby

Rugby union governing bodies in the United States